Sussex County Courthouse Historic District is a historic courthouse complex and national historic district located at Sussex, Sussex County, Virginia.  The district encompasses four buildings in the complex: the clerk's office (1924), the court house, the County Office Building, jail and the Dillard House (c. 1800). Other buildings are the mid-19th century county treasurer's office and the John Bannister House.  The county courthouse building was built in 1828 by Dabney Cosby, and is a two-story, seven bay, Jeffersonian Classicism style brick building.  It has a cross-gable roof with cupola and features a three-bay arcade, one-bay deep with five rounded arches, on its front facade.  A six bay brick addition was built in 1954.  The building is one of a number of county courthouses inspired by the architecture of Thomas Jefferson, who employed its builder Dabney Cosby in the building of the University of Virginia.

It was listed on the National Register of Historic Places in 1973.

References

County courthouses in Virginia
Courthouses on the National Register of Historic Places in Virginia
Neoclassical architecture in Virginia
Government buildings completed in 1828
National Register of Historic Places in Sussex County, Virginia
Buildings and structures in Sussex County, Virginia
Historic districts on the National Register of Historic Places in Virginia